Rewriting Techniques and Applications (RTA) is an annual international academic conference on the topic of rewriting. It covers all aspects of rewriting, including termination, equational reasoning, theorem proving, higher-order rewriting, unification and the lambda calculus. The conference consists of peer-reviewed papers with the proceedings published by Springer in the LNCS series until 2009, and since then in the LIPIcs series published by the Leibniz-Zentrum für Informatik. Several rewriting-related workshops are also affiliated with RTA.

The first RTA was held in Dijon, France in September 1983. RTA took part in the federated conferences Federated Logic Conference (FLoC) and Rewriting, Deduction, and Programming (RDP). In 2016, RTA merged with the International Conference on Typed Lambda Calculi and Applications to form the International Conference on
Formal Structures for Computation and Deduction (FSCD).

External links 
Official website
List of the 26 RTA conferences, 1985-2015
List of the six FSCD conferences, 2016-2021
Rewriting Techniques and Applications
International Conference on Formal Structures for Computation and Deduction

Theoretical computer science conferences
Logic conferences